Sir Thomas Browne (19 October 160519 October 1682) was an English polymath and author of varied works which reveal his wide learning in diverse fields including science and medicine, religion and the esoteric. His writings display a deep curiosity towards the natural world, influenced by the scientific revolution of Baconian enquiry and are permeated by references to Classical and Biblical sources as well as the idiosyncrasies of his own personality. Although often described as suffused with melancholia, Browne's writings are also characterised by wit and subtle humour, while his literary style is varied, according to genre, resulting in a rich, unique prose which ranges from rough notebook observations to polished Baroque eloquence.

Biography

Early life 
Thomas Browne was born in the parish of St Michael, Cheapside, in London on 19 October 1605, the youngest child—having an elder brother and two elder sisters—of Thomas Browne, a silk merchant from Upton, Cheshire, and Anne Browne, the daughter of Paul Garraway of Lewes, Sussex. The family lived at Upton for several generations, "evidently people of some importance" who "intermarried with families of position in that neighbourhood", and were armigerous. Browne's paternal grandmother, Elizabeth, was daughter of Henry Birkenhead, Clerk of the Green Cloth to Elizabeth I of England and Clerk of the Crown for the counties of Cheshire and Flintshire. Browne's father died while he was young, and his mother married Sir Thomas Dutton of Gloucester and Isleworth, Middlesex, by whom she had two daughters.

Browne was educated at Winchester College. In 1623, he went to Broadgates Hall of Oxford University. Browne was chosen to deliver the undergraduate oration when the hall was incorporated as Pembroke College in August 1624. He graduated from Oxford in January 1627, after which he studied medicine at Padua and Montpellier universities, completing his studies at Leiden, where he received a medical degree in 1633.  He settled in Norwich in 1637 and practised medicine there until his death in 1682. In 1641, Browne married Dorothy Mileham of Burlingham St Peter, Norfolk. She bore him 10 children, six of whom died before their parents.

Literary works

Browne's first literary work was Religio Medici (The Religion of a Physician) which was circulated as a manuscript among his friends. It surprised him when an unauthorised edition appeared in 1642, since the work included several unorthodox religious speculations. An authorised text appeared in 1643, with some of the more controversial views removed. The expurgation did not end the controversy: in 1645, Alexander Ross attacked Religio Medici in his Medicus Medicatus (The Doctor, Doctored) and, in common with much Protestant literature, the book was placed upon the Papal Index Librorum Prohibitorum in the same year.

In 1646 Browne published his encyclopaedia, Pseudodoxia Epidemica, or, Enquiries into Very many Received Tenents, and commonly Presumed Truths, the title of which refers to the prevalence of false beliefs and "vulgar errors".  A sceptical work that debunks a number of legends circulating at the time in a methodical and witty manner, it displays the Baconian side of Browne—the side that was unafraid of what at the time was still called "the new learning".  The book is significant in the history of science because it promoted an awareness of up-to-date scientific journalism.

Browne's last publication during his lifetime were two philosophical Discourses which are closely related to each other in concept. The first, Hydriotaphia, Urn Burial, or a Brief Discourse of the Sepulchral Urns lately found in Norfolk (1658), inspired by the discovery of some 40 to 50 Anglo-Saxon pots in Norfolk, resulted in a literary meditation upon death, the funerary customs of the world and the ephemerality of fame. The other discourse in the diptych is antithetical in style, subject-matter and imagery. The Garden of Cyrus, or The Quincuncial Lozenge, or Network Plantations of the Ancients, Artificially, Naturally, and Mystically Considered (1658) features the quincunx which is used by Browne to demonstrate evidence of the Platonic forms in art and nature.

Later life and knighthood 

In Religio Medici, Browne confirmed his belief, in accordance with the vast majority of seventeenth century European society, in the existence of angels and witchcraft. He attended the 1662 Bury St Edmunds witch trial, where his citation of a similar trial in Denmark may have influenced the jury's minds of the guilt of two accused women, who were subsequently executed for witchcraft.

In 1671 King Charles II, accompanied by the Court, visited Norwich. The courtier John Evelyn, who had occasionally corresponded with Browne, took good use of the royal visit to call upon "the learned doctor" of European fame and wrote of his visit, "His whole house and garden is a paradise and Cabinet of rarities and that of the best collection, amongst Medails, books, Plants, natural things".

During his visit, Charles visited Browne's home. A banquet was held in St Andrew's Hall for the royal visit.  Obliged to honour a notable local, the name of the Mayor of Norwich was proposed to the King for knighthood. The Mayor, however, declined the honour and proposed Browne's name instead.

Death and aftermath 

Browne died on 19 October 1682, his 77th birthday, and was buried in the chancel of St Peter Mancroft, Norwich. His skull was removed when his lead coffin was accidentally re-opened by workmen in 1840. It was not re-interred in St Peter Mancroft until 4 July 1922 when it was recorded in the burial register as aged 317 years. Browne's coffin plate,  which was stolen the same time as his skull, was also eventually recovered, broken into two halves, one of which is on display at St Peter Mancroft. Alluding to the commonplace opus of alchemy it reads, Amplissimus Vir Dns. Thomas Browne, Miles, Medicinae Dr., Annos Natus 77 Denatus 19 Die mensis Octobris, Anno. Dni. 1682, hoc Loculo indormiens. Corporis Spagyrici pulvere plumbum in aurum Convertit. — translated from Latin as "The esteemed Gentleman Thomas Browne, Knight, Doctor of Medicine, 77 years old, died on the 19th of October in the year of Our Lord 1682 and lies sleeping in this coffin. With the dust of his alchemical body he converts lead into gold". The origin of the invented word spagyrici is from the Greek spao to tear open + ageiro to collect, a signature neologism coined by Paracelsus to define his medicine-oriented alchemy; the origins of iatrochemistry, being first advanced by him.

Browne's coffin-plate verse, along with the collected works of Paracelsus and several followers of the Swiss physician listed in his library, are evidence that although sometimes highly critical of Paracelsus, nevertheless, like the 'Luther of Medicine', he believed in palingenesis, physiognomy, alchemy, astrology and the kabbalah.

The Library of Sir Thomas Browne was held in the care of his eldest son Edward until 1708. The auction of Browne and his son Edward's libraries in January 1711 was attended by Hans Sloane. Editions from the library were subsequently included in the founding collection of the British Library.

Autobiography
On 14 March 1673, Browne sent a short autobiography to the antiquarian John Aubrey, presumably for Aubrey's collection of Brief Lives, which provides an introduction to his life and writings.

...I was born in St Michael's Cheap in London, went to school at Winchester College, then went to Oxford, spent some years in foreign parts, was admitted to be a Socius Honorarius of the College of Physicians in London, Knighted September 1671, when the King Charles II, the Queen and Court came to Norwich. Writ Religio Medici in English, which was since translated into Latin, French, Italian, High and Low Dutch, Pseudodoxia Epidemica, or Enquiries into Common and Vulgar Errors translated into Dutch four or five years ago. Hydriotaphia, or Urn Buriall. Hortus Cyri, or de Quincunce. Have some miscellaneous tracts which may be published...(Letters 376)

Literary influence

Browne is widely considered one of the most original writers in the English language. The freshness and ingenuity of his mind invested everything he touched with interest; while on more important subjects his style, if frequently ornate and Latinate, often rises to the highest pitch of stately eloquence.  He has a paradoxical and ambiguous place in the history of ideas, as equally, a devout Christian, a promoter of the new inductive science, and an adherent of ancient esoteric learning. For these reasons, one literary critic succinctly assessed him as "an instance of scientific reason lit up by mysticism in the Church of England". However, the complexity of Browne's labyrinthine thought processes, his highly stylised language, along with his many allusions to Biblical, Classical and contemporary learning, along with esoteric authors, are each contributing factors for why he remains obscure, little-read, and, thus, misunderstood.

Browne appears at No. 69 in the Oxford English Dictionarys list of top cited sources. He has 775 entries in the OED of first usage of a word, is quoted in a total of 4131 entries of first evidence of a word, and is quoted 1596 times as first evidence of a particular meaning of a word. Examples of his coinages, many of which are of a scientific or medical nature, include 'ambidextrous', 'antediluvian', 'analogous', 'approximate', 'ascetic', 'anomalous', 'carnivorous', 'coexistence', 'coma', 'compensate', 'computer', 'cryptography', 'cylindrical', 'disruption', 'ergotisms', 'electricity', 'exhaustion', 'ferocious', 'follicle', 'generator', 'gymnastic', 'hallucination', 'herbaceous', 'holocaust', 'insecurity', 'indigenous', 'jocularity', 'literary', 'locomotion', 'medical', 'migrant', 'mucous', 'prairie', 'prostate', 'polarity', 'precocious', 'pubescent', 'therapeutic', 'suicide', 'ulterior', 'ultimate' and 'veterinarian'.

The influence of his literary style spans four centuries.
In the 18th century, Samuel Johnson, who shared Browne's love of the Latinate, wrote a brief Life in which he praised Browne as a faithful Christian and assessed his prose thus:

In the 19th century Browne's reputation was revived by the Romantics. Thomas De Quincey, Samuel Taylor Coleridge, and Charles Lamb (who considered himself the rediscoverer of Browne) were all admirers. Carlyle was also influenced by him.
The American novelist Herman Melville, heavily influenced by his style, deemed him a "crack'd Archangel."
The epigraph of Edgar Allan Poe's "The Murders in the Rue Morgue" (1841) is from Browne's Hydriotaphia (Chap. 5): "What song the Syrens sang, or what name Achilles assumed when he hid himself among women, although puzzling questions, are not beyond all conjecture".

In the 20th century those who have admired Browne include:

 The American natural historian and palaeontologist Stephen Jay Gould.
 The novelist Joseph Conrad prefaced his 1913 novel Chance with a quotation by Browne:

 The English author Virginia Woolf wrote two short essays about him, observing in 1923, "Few people love the writings of Sir Thomas Browne, but those that do are the salt of the earth."
 The theosophist Madame Blavatsky.
 The Scottish psychologist R. D. Laing, who opens his work The Politics of Experience with a quotation by him : " thus is man that great and true Amphibian whose nature is disposed to live not only like other creatures in divers elements, but in divided and distinguished worlds."
 The composer William Alwyn wrote a symphony in 1973 based upon the rhythmical cadences of Browne's literary work Hydriotaphia, Urn Burial.
 The American author Armistead Maupin includes a quote from Religio Medici in the preface to the third in his Tales of the City novels, Further Tales of the City, first published in 1982.
 The Canadian physician William Osler (1849–1919), the "founding father of modern medicine", was a well-read admirer of Browne.
 The German author W. G. Sebald wrote of Browne in his semi-autobiographical novel The Rings of Saturn (1995).
 The Argentinian writer Jorge Luis Borges alluded to Browne throughout his literary writings, from his first publication, Fervor de Buenos Aires (1923) until his last years. He described Browne as "the best prose writer in the English language".  Such was his admiration of Browne as a literary stylist and thinker that late in his life (Interview 25 April 1980) he stated of himself, alluding to his self-portrait in "Tlön, Uqbar, Orbis Tertius" (1940):

 In his short story "The Celestial Omnibus", published in 1911, E. M. Forster makes Browne the first "driver" that the young protagonist encounters on the magical omnibus line that transports its passengers to a place of direct experience of the aesthetic sublime reserved for those who internalise the experience of poetry, as opposed to those who merely acquire familiarity with literary works for snobbish prestige. The story is an allegory about true appreciation of poetry and literature versus pedantry.
 In North Towards Homeì, Willie Morris quotes Sir Thomas Browne's Urn Burial from memory as he walks up Park Avenue with William Styron: "'And since death must be the Lucina of life, and even Pagans could doubt, whether thus to live were to die; since our longest sun sets at right descensions, and makes but winter arches, and therefore it cannot be long before we lie down in darkness and have our light in ashes...' At that instant I was almost clipped by a taxicab, and the driver stuck his head out and yelled, 'Aincha got eyes in that head, ya bum?'"

 William Styron prefaced his 1951 novel Lie Down in Darkness with the same quotation and the title comes from that quotation.
 Spanish writer Javier Marías translated two works of Browne into Spanish, Religio Medici and Hydriotaphia.
The British ornithologist Tim Birkhead has said of Browne:

 Clive James included an essay on Browne in his Cultural Amnesia collection. James celebrated Browne's style and originality, stating that Browne was "minting new coin" with everything he wrote.
 Tony Kushner's play Hydriotaphia, or the Death of Doctor Browne (written in 1987, first produced in 1998) is an "epic farce" imagining Browne's last days.

Portraits and influence in the visual arts 
 The National Portrait Gallery in London has a contemporary portrait by Joan Carlile of Sir Thomas Browne and his wife Dorothy, probably completed between 1641 and 1650.
 More recent sculptural portraits include Henry Alfred Pegram's 1905 statue of Sir Thomas contemplating with urn in Norwich. This statue occupies the central position in the Haymarket beside St Peter Mancroft, not far from the site of his house. Unveiled on 19 October 1905, it was moved from its original position in 1973.
 In 1931 the English painter Paul Nash was invited to illustrate a book of his own choice, Nash choose Sir Thomas Browne's Urn Burial and The Garden of Cyrus, providing the publisher with a set of 32 illustrations to accompany Browne's Discourses. The edition was published in 1932. A pencil drawing by Nash called "Urne Buriall: Teeth, Bones and Hair" is held by Birmingham Museums Trust.
 In 2005 a small standing figure in silver and bronze, commissioned for the 400th anniversary of Browne's birth, was sculpted by Robert Mileham.
In 2016 the artists Peter Rodulfo and Mark Burrell elected Browne as honorary Great-Grandfather of the North Sea Magical Realists art-movement. Simultaneously they realised in painting items taken from Browne's Musaeum Clausum in its Rarities in Pictures section. (Rodulfo # 3, Burrell # 12).

Publications

 Religio Medici (1643)
 Pseudodoxia Epidemica (1646–72)
 Hydriotaphia, Urn Burial (1658)
 The Garden of Cyrus (1658)
 A Letter to a Friend (1656; pub. 1690)
 Christian Morals (1670s; pub. 1716)
 Musaeum Clausum Tract 13 from Miscellaneous Tracts first pub. 1684

See also

 Francis Bacon
 Johannes Kepler
 Scientific Revolution
 Neoplatonism
 Hermeticism
 The Garden of Cyrus
 Hydriotaphia, Urn Burial
 Library of Sir Thomas Browne

References

Sources
 Reid Barbour and Claire Preston (eds), Sir Thomas Browne: The World Proposed (Oxford, OUP, 2008).

Further reading

Wilding, Michael, 'Dragons Teeth: Literature in the English Revolution' (Oxford: Clarendon Press, 1987)

External links

 Website which acts as a portal to Browne-related media. Information on Norwich-based, national and international events listed.  Sir Thomas Browne Organisation
The Sir Thomas Browne Page at the University of Chicago, a comprehensive site with the complete works mentioned above, plus the minor works; Samuel Johnson's Life of Browne, Kenelm Digby's Observations on Religio Medici, and Alexander Ross's Medicus Medicatus; and background material, such as many of Browne's sources.
 Quotations by Sir Thomas Browne at Quotidiana.org.
 The Thomas Browne Seminar
  Various essays on Browne at Aquarium of Vulcan
 Alchemical and Hermetic thought in the literary works of Sir Thomas Browne
 Spiritual and literary affinity between Julian of Norwich and Sir Thomas Browne.
 Prayer and Prophecy in Browne's life and writings.
 Interview with Jorge Luis Borges, 25 April 1980, discussing Browne
 
 
 
 Sir Thomas Browne Quotes at Convergence
 "Sir Thomas Browne: The Man And The Physician" by A. Batty Shaw, British Medical Journal (Clinical Research Edition), Vol. 285, No. 6334 (Jul. 3, 1982), pp. 40–42

English science writers
English non-fiction writers
English encyclopedists
Protestant mystics
Christian Kabbalists
Physiognomists
Paracelsians
People educated at Winchester College
Alumni of Broadgates Hall, Oxford
Leiden University alumni
Anglican writers
English knights
1605 births
1682 deaths
17th-century Christian mystics
Writers from Norwich
17th-century English medical doctors
English male non-fiction writers
British expatriates in the Dutch Republic
British medical writers